Metropolitan France ( or la Métropole), also known as European France is the area of France which is geographically in Europe. This collective name for the European regions of France is used in everyday life in France but has no administrative meaning. Indeed, the overseas regions have exactly the same administrative status as the metropolitan regions. Metropolitan France comprises mainland France and Corsica, as well as nearby islands in the Atlantic Ocean, the English Channel, and the Mediterranean Sea.

In contrast, overseas France is the collective name for all the French territories outside Europe. Metropolitan and overseas France together form the French Republic. Metropolitan France accounts for 82.0% of the land territory, 3.3% of the exclusive economic zone (EEZ), and 95.9% of the population of the French Republic. Some small parts of France (e.g. Cerdanya) are a part of the Iberian Peninsula.

In overseas France, a person from metropolitan France is often called a métro, short for métropolitain.

Etymology
The term "metropolitan France" dates from the country's colonial period (from the 16th to the 20th centuries), when France was referred to as la Métropole (literally "the Metropolis"), as distinguished from its colonies and protectorates, known as les colonies or l'Empire. Similar terms existed to describe other European colonial powers (e.g. "metropolitan Britain", "España metropolitana"). This application of the words "metropolis" and "metropolitan" came from Ancient Greek "metropolis" (from μήτηρ mētēr "mother" and πόλις pólis "city, town"), which was the name for a city-state that created colonies across the Mediterranean (e.g. Marseille was a colony of the city-state of Phocaea; therefore Phocaea was the "metropolis" of Marseille). By extension "metropolis" and "metropolitan" came to mean "motherland", a nation or country as opposed to its colonies overseas.

Today, some people in Overseas France object to the use of the term la France métropolitaine due to its colonial history. They prefer to call it "the European territory of France" (le territoire européen de la France), as the Treaties of the European Union do. Likewise, they oppose treating overseas France and metropolitan France as separate entities. For example, INSEE used to calculate its statistics (demography, economy, etc.) for metropolitan France only, and to analyze separate statistics for the overseas departments and territories. People in the overseas departments have opposed this separate treatment, arguing that the then four overseas departments were fully part of France.

As a result, since the end of the 1990s INSEE has included the four overseas departments in its figures for France (such as total population or GDP). The fifth overseas department, Mayotte, has been included in the figures for France since the mid-2010s too. INSEE refers to metropolitan France and the five overseas departments as la France entière ("the whole of France"). "The whole of France" includes the five overseas departments, but does not include the other overseas collectivities and territories that have more autonomy than the departments. Other branches of the French administration may have different definitions of what la France entière is. For example, in contrast to INSEE, when the Ministry of the Interior releases election results, they use the term la France entière to refer to the entire French Republic, including all of overseas France, and not just the five overseas departments.

Note that since INSEE now calculates statistics for la France entière, this practice has spread to international institutions. For instance, the French GDP published by the World Bank includes metropolitan France and the five overseas departments. The World Bank refers to this total as "France"; it does not use the phrase "the whole of France", as INSEE does.

Statistics
Thus, metropolitan France accounts for 82.0% of the French Republic's land territory.

Thus, metropolitan France accounts for 3.3% of the French Republic's EEZ.

According to INSEE, 65,250,000 people lived in metropolitan France as of January 2021, while 2,785,000 lived in overseas France, for a total of 68,035,000 inhabitants in the French Republic. Thus, metropolitan France accounts for 95.9% of the French Republic's population.

In the second round of the 2017 French presidential election, 35,467,327 French people cast a ballot (meaning a turnout of 74.56%). 33,883,463 of these (95.53% of the total voters) cast their ballots in metropolitan France (turnout: 76.26%), 1,003,910 (2.83% of the total voters) cast their ballots in overseas France (turnout: 53.59%), and 579,954 (1.64% of the total voters) cast their ballots in foreign countries (French people living abroad; turnout: 45.84%).

The French National Assembly is made up of 577 deputies, 539 of whom (93.4% of the total) are elected in metropolitan France, 27 (4.7% of the total) in overseas France, and 11 (1.9% of the total) by French citizens living in foreign countries.

Mainland France

Mainland France (French: la France continentale), or just "the mainland" (French: le continent), does not include the French islands in the Atlantic Ocean, English Channel or Mediterranean Sea, the largest of which is Corsica.

In Corsica, people from the mainland part of metropolitan France are referred to as les continentaux.

A casual synonym for the mainland part of metropolitan France is l'Hexagone ("the Hexagon"), for its approximate shape, and the adjective hexagonal may be a casual synonym of French (usually understood as metropolitan only, except in topics related to the foreign affairs and national politics of France as a whole). The image of France as a hexagon first appeared in French geography texts of the 1850s.

See also 

 Contiguous United States
 Continental Portugal
 French colonial empire
 Mainland
 Mainland Australia
 Mainland China
 Mainland Tanzania
 Wildlife of France

Notes

References 

M01
Geography of Western Europe
Geography of Southwestern Europe
France
.
.
.
Southwestern Europe
Western Europe